Lacey Branch is a  long 1st order tributary to Lanes Creek in Anson County, North Carolina.

Course
Lacey Branch rises in a pond about 1 mile northeast of Marshville, North Carolina in Union County.  Lacey Branch then flows east-southeast into Anson County to meet Lanes Creek on the northwest side of Peachland.

Watershed
Lacey Branch drains  of area, receives about 48.1 in/year of precipitation, has a topographic wetness index of 430.41 and is about 39% forested.

References

Rivers of North Carolina
Rivers of Anson County, North Carolina
Rivers of Union County, North Carolina
Tributaries of the Pee Dee River